Costuleni is a commune in Iași County, Western Moldavia, Romania. It is composed of four villages: Costuleni, Covasna, Cozia and Hilița.

References

Communes in Iași County
Localities in Western Moldavia